Cominella otagoensis is a species of predatory sea snail, a marine gastropod mollusc in the family Cominellidae, the true whelks.

Distribution
This marine species is endemic to New Zealand.

References

 Powell A W B, New Zealand Mollusca, William Collins Publishers Ltd, Auckland, New Zealand 1979 
 Spencer, H.G., Marshall, B.A. & Willan, R.C. (2009). Checklist of New Zealand living Mollusca. Pp 196-219. in: Gordon, D.P. (ed.) New Zealand inventory of biodiversity. Volume one. Kingdom Animalia: Radiata, Lophotrochozoa, Deuterostomia. Canterbury University Press, Christchurch.

External links
 Finlay H.J. (1926). A further commentary on New Zealand molluscan systematics. Transactions of the New Zealand Institute. 57: 320-485, pls 18-23
 Donald K.M, Winter D.J., Ashcroft A.L. & Spencer H.G. (2015). Phylogeography of the whelk genus Cominella (Gastropoda: Buccinidae) suggests long-distance counter-current dispersal of a direct developer. Biological Journal of the Linnean Society of London. 115: 315-332

Cominellidae
Gastropods of New Zealand
Gastropods described in 1927
Taxa named by Harold John Finlay